Streptomyces coacervatus is a Gram-positive bacterium species from the genus of Streptomyces which has been isolated from the intestinal tract of the common pill-bug Armadillidium vulgare in Chiba City in Japan.

See also 
 List of Streptomyces species

References

Further reading

External links
Type strain of Streptomyces coacervatus at BacDive -  the Bacterial Diversity Metadatabase

coacervatus
Bacteria described in 2011